The I-70 killer is an unidentified American serial killer who is known to have killed six store clerks in the Midwest in the spring of 1992. His nickname derives from the fact that several of the stores in which his victims worked were located a few miles off of Interstate 70.

His victims were usually young, petite, brunette women. One of the victims was a man, but it is believed that the killer may have expected a woman in the store due to the store having a woman's name. All of the stores attacked were specialty stores and were usually only robbed of small amounts of cash. He is also suspected of shooting three more store clerks in Texas during 1993 and 1994, one of whom survived, as well as a 2001 murder of a store clerk in Terre Haute, Indiana.

Despite the case being featured on Unsolved Mysteries, America's Most Wanted, and Dark Minds, the killer is yet to be identified and investigators have not publicly identified any suspects.

1992 murder spree

Robin Fuldauer 
The killing spree began on April 8, 1992, with the murder of 26-year-old Payless ShoeSource manager Robin Fuldauer in Indianapolis. She was alone in the store when she was shot, having been murdered sometime around 1:30 p.m. Her body was discovered in a storage room in the back of the store around 3:00 p.m. Less than $100 had been stolen from the cash register.

Patricia Magers and Patricia Smith 
The next two murders occurred on April 11 at the La Bride d'Elegance bridal shop in Wichita. The victims were Patricia Smith, 23, and the store's owner, 32-year-old Patricia Magers. As this was the only case involving multiple victims, investigators believe the killer was under the impression that there was only one woman in the store. The women had stayed past the normal closing time of 6 p.m. to allow a male customer to pick up a cummerbund. Sometime after 6 p.m., the women allowed the killer into the store, thinking he was the customer they were waiting for. After the women were murdered, the actual customer arrived to pick up the cummerbund and came face-to-face with the I-70 killer. The customer noticed that the killer had a gun and the killer asked the customer to come with him to the back of the store with him. The customer refused after which the killer told him to leave the scene. Had the customer co-operated with the killer, he almost certainly would have been murdered as well. The customer was so frightened that he did not report the incident until more than an hour had passed. He later provided details for a composite sketch of the killer, describing the killer as a slender white man with reddish hair armed with an Uzi-style gun.

Michael McCown 
On April 27, Michael McCown, 40, was killed in his mother Sylvia's ceramics store in Terre Haute, Indiana around 4:00 p.m. McCown's wallet and less than $50 were stolen from the store. No witnesses reported seeing the killer beforehand. McCown was the only man killed during the spree and it is believed by investigators that the I-70 killer chose the store because the store's solo woman's name (Sylvia's Ceramics) seemed to make it a good target. Because McCown was reported to wear his hair in a ponytail and was shot from behind, while he was kneeling to stock shelves, he may have been mistaken for a woman.

Nancy Kitzmiller 
On May 3, 24-year-old Nancy Kitzmiller was killed while working alone at Boot Village, a footwear shop in St. Charles, Missouri. She opened up the shop at noon and was found dead by customers at 2:30 p.m. She had been shot in the back of the head. She was supposed to be off that day; however, she agreed to come in so that a co-worker could have the day off. Some money was taken from the cash register. Although no one heard the shot, a witness did see her with her final customer just minutes before her death and this sighting helped police to create a composite drawing.

Sarah Blessing 
The final confirmed murder occurred on May 7 in Raytown, Missouri. The victim was 37-year-old Sarah Blessing who was working in her gift shop, Store of Many Colors. The murder occurred during the day, and the owner of the video store next to Blessing's shop saw the killer enter the shop, heard a pop, and then saw him leave. He discovered Blessing's body after checking to see what had occurred in the store. A clerk at a nearby grocery store also saw the suspect. He was climbing a hill towards I-70.

Suspected murders

1993 Texas murders 
Investigators believe the I-70 killer may be responsible for two murders in 1993, and an attempted murder in 1994, all of which occurred in Texas. The two murder victims were 51-year-old Mary Ann Glasscock, who was killed on September 25, 1993, in Fort Worth at the Emporium Antiques store, and 22-year-old Amy Vess, who was shot to death in a dance apparel store in Arlington on November 1.

The surviving victim was Vicki Webb, 35, who was shot on January 15, 1994, in Houston at the Alternatives gift shop. She briefly talked to the shooter before he shot her in the back of the head. The bullet did not penetrate into Webb's head due to a large vertebra being hit. The shooter attempted to shoot her again, but his gun misfired, and he left presuming Webb to be dead.

The modus operandi of the Texas killer was very similar to the I-70 killer and he used a .22-caliber firearm, the same caliber as the I-70 killer. A ballistics test determined that the gun used in the Texas murders was not the same as the one used in the I-70 killings, however, so investigators have not been able to confirm that the I-70 killer was responsible for the shootings in Texas.

2001 Terre Haute murder 
In November 2021, Terre Haute police announced that the I-70 killer was a possible suspect in the 2001 murder of 31-year-old liquor store clerk Billy Brossman. On the evening of November 30, 2001 Brossman was working alone at the 7th and 70 Liquor Store in Terre Haute. Security camera footage showed a white male suspect enter the store and pull a gun on Brossman and rob the cash register. The footage then showed the suspect lead Brossman to the back of the store and murder him with a single shot to the back of the head. The murder of Brossman occurred just seven blocks from the murder of Michael McCown and was similar in modus operandi to the I-70 murders. Unlike in the I-70 murders, security footage of Brossman's killer exists and police have stated they have a person of interest in the case.

Investigation 
The murders were conclusively linked after a St. Charles detective suspected a connection. All of the murders were committed with a .22-caliber firearm and the victims were usually petite, young women with long dark hair. Aside from the Wichita murders, all the victims were alone. All were shot in the back of the head. None of the scenes had any signs of sexual assault and while all stores were robbed, robbery appeared to be a secondary motive as all the stores were small specialty businesses, which did not have much money. The murders took place at slow times of day when the stores were deserted, such as after lunch or around closing time. Several of them were in strip malls near I-70.

Based on witness testimonies, police strongly believe the murder weapon may have been an Intratec Scorpion pistol or an Erma Werke ET22 pistol. They have not, however, been able to rule out any other .22-caliber firearm models. The ammunition used in the killings was .22-caliber CCI copper-clad lead bullets. The casings of the cartridges showed traces of jeweler's rouge. Midwest authorities linked the killer to the shootings in Texas in 1994, but Texas authorities were not convinced of a connection as different guns were used in each spree.

Based on witness descriptions, investigators were able to produce two composite sketches of the killer and a physical description of the suspect. The I-70 killer was described as being a white man in his twenties or thirties, 5'7" (1.70 m) to 5'9" (1.75 m) tall, thin and having lazy eyelids and sandy blond or reddish hair in 1992. In 2021, the St. Charles police department published age-progressed versions of the original composite sketch to show what the killer may look like today. Investigators believe the killer is between 52 and 70 years old if he is still alive. Police have not publicly identified any suspects and the case has been classified as a cold case.

See also 
 List of fugitives from justice who disappeared
 List of serial killers in the United States

References 

1992 in Indiana
1992 in Kansas
1992 in Missouri
1992 murders in the United States
1993 in Texas
1993 murders in the United States
20th-century American criminals
American male criminals
American serial killers
American spree killers
Crime in Indiana
Crime in Kansas
Crime in Missouri
Crime in Texas
Deaths by firearm in Indiana
Deaths by firearm in Kansas
Deaths by firearm in Missouri
Deaths by firearm in Texas
Fugitives
Interstate 70
Male serial killers
Possibly living people
Spree shootings in the United States
Unidentified serial killers
Unsolved murders in the United States